Tanner Creek is a creek located in the Columbia River Gorge in Multnomah County, Oregon, United States, that is a tributary of the Columbia River.

Description

The watershed is bounded by Munra Ridge to the west and Tanner Ridge to the east.

The falls are a popular recreation destination, with the Wahclella Falls Trail #436 running for 2.4 miles along the creek from the Historic Columbia River Highway State Trail to the falls.

Further up the creek canyon, the remote Tanner Creek Trail #431 is a lightly-travelled trail running along the creek from the end of the closed Tanner Creek Road (Forest Road 8400-777). Connections to the road, Tanner Cutoff Trail #448 and the Moffett Creek Trail #430 connect this trail with the remainder of the Gorge's trail network.

The Tanner Creek watershed was severely impacted by the Eagle Creek Fire of 2017, with a large portion of the canyon experiencing a severe burn severity. Due to the increased risk of landslides, debris flows, and other hazards, recreation in the area remains closed .

See also

 List of rivers of Oregon

References

External links

Columbia River Gorge
Rivers of Multnomah County, Oregon
Rivers of Oregon
Tributaries of the Columbia River